Nick Quartaro (born October 5, 1955) is an American football coach and former player.  He is currently the assistant head coach and tight ends coach for the football team at the University of North Texas.  Quartaro served as the head football coach Drake University from 1987 to 1988 and at Fordham University from 1994 to 1997.

Coaching career
Quartaro has worked as an assistant coach at several colleges, including Northwestern University, Hobart College, Kansas State University under Bill Snyder, and the University of Kansas as offensive coordinator under Mark Mangino.
After retiring from coaching in 2006, Quartaro became an insurance executive.  He returned to coaching in 2010 at the University of North Texas.

Head coaching record

References

External links
 Iowa State profile

1955 births
Living people
American football defensive ends
American football placekickers
Drake Bulldogs football coaches
Fordham Rams football coaches
Hobart Statesmen football coaches
Iowa Hawkeyes football players
Iowa State Cyclones football coaches
Kansas Jayhawks football coaches
Kansas State Wildcats football coaches
North Texas Mean Green football coaches
Northwestern Wildcats football coaches
Xavier Musketeers football players